David Jones Davies was Dean of Saint Paul's Cathedral, Wellington from 1948 to 1962.

Davies was educated at the University of Wales and St. Michael's College, Llandaff; and ordained in 1916. After  curacies in  Canton, Mottram in Longdendale and Gisborne, New Zealand he held incumbencies at Ōpunake, Greytown, Palmerston North and Kilbirnie before joining the staff of  Saint Paul's Cathedral, Wellington in 1938.

References

1912 births
1987 deaths
Alumni of the University of Wales
Alumni of St Michael's College, Llandaff
Deans of Wellington